Grubstake, also known as Apache Gold, is a 1952 American Western film directed by Larry Buchanan.

Cast
Stephen Wyman
Jack Klugman
Neile Adams
Lynn Shubert
Kort Falkenberg

Production
According to Larry Buchanan, Stanley Kubrick offered his services as cinematographer but he wanted to be paid $1,000 a week and Buchanan was only offering $350.

Jack Klugman appears in an early role.

References

External links
 

1952 films
1952 Western (genre) films
American Western (genre) films
Films directed by Larry Buchanan
1950s English-language films
1950s American films